Joo Hee-sun is a South Korean music video director, and CEO of Iceland. Joo directed numerous music videos of Korean K-pop artists such as Kara and Sistar.

Career

Award
2009 M.net Asia Award (aka. Mnet Asian Music Awards), Nominated for Best Music video director

Filmography

Music Video

Broadcasting
CJ Olive channel, She’s Olive Han Chae-young France 50min, 2 Episodes
CJ Olive channel, Choi Kang-hee Kang Hee’s 6 Kinds of Addictions 50min 6 Episodes

Miscellaneous
2009 Choi Kang-hee's Collection of Essay Trifling Happiness of Trivial Kid Iceland DVD
2012 KARA Japan Concert Tour

References
 

Year of birth missing (living people)
Living people
South Korean directors